Carabus akinini is a species of ground beetle from Carabinae subfamily that can be found in China, Kazakhstan, and Kyrgyzstan.

Subspecies include:
 Carabus akinini akinini
 Carabus akinini buffi
 Carabus akinini elisabethae
 Carabus akinini ketmenensis
 Carabus akinini loudai

References

akinini
Beetles described in 1886
Beetles of Asia